One Shot is a 2021 British action thriller film directed by James Nunn and starring Scott Adkins, Ashley Greene Khoury and Ryan Phillippe. The film follows a Navy SEAL squad conducting a transport mission of a prisoner while dealing with insurgents who are after the same prisoner. One Shot was released by Screen Media Films in theaters and on VOD on November 5, 2021. It garnered mixed reviews from critics.

Synopsis 
An elite squad of Navy SEALs, on a covert mission to transport a prisoner off a CIA black site island prison, are trapped when insurgents attack while trying to rescue the same prisoner.

Cast
Scott Adkins as Jake Harris
Ashley Greene Khoury as Zoe Anderson
Ryan Phillippe as Jack Yorke
Emmanuel Imani as Brandon Whitaker
Dino Kelly as Danny Dietler
Jack Parr as Lewis Ash
Waleed Elgadi as Amin Mansur
Terence Maynard as Tom Shields
Jess Liaudin as Hakim Charef
Andrei Maniata as Adamat
Lee Charles as Dhelkor

Release
Screen Media Films acquired North American distribution rights to the film in August 2021. The film was released in theaters and on VOD on November 5, 2021.

Reception
One Shot received mixed reviews from critics. It has a 59% approval rating on Rotten Tomatoes based on 22 reviews, with an average score of 5.3/10.

Dennis Harvey of Variety gave the film a positive review and wrote, "Still, director James Nunn’s reunion with star Scott Adkins does effectively use that device to heighten immediacy in an effort that may not transcend their usual B-grade, adrenaline-fueled macho fare, but does bring some welcome novelty to the genre." Mark Peikert of IndieWire graded the film a C and wrote, "Lacking the polish of other entries such as Birdman and 1917, One Shot feels like a first-person shooter video game with the camera reversed for once." Leslie Felperin of The Guardian criticised the film for its "risibly cliched dialogue" and "wooden, poorly directed acting", but commended the technical aspects for its "crisp" digital technology and lighting, calling it "weirdly mesmeric as it is schlocky." Chris Knight of the National Post was commendable towards the continuous shot technique being "well executed" but felt it wasn't enough to prevent the story from being "a little thin", concluding that "while it may in fact be possible to take something that is normally edited and present it in a single, breathless rush, it's not always the best idea to do so."

References

External links
 
 

2021 action thriller films
2020s British films
British action thriller films
Films about terrorism
Films set in prison
Films shot in the United Kingdom
One-shot films